The streaked saltator (Saltator striatipectus) is a species of saltator in the family Thraupidae. It is found in Colombia, Costa Rica, Ecuador, Guadeloupe, Panama, Peru, and Venezuela.

Measuring , this species has plain olive green upperparts and olive streaked underparts. Its face features a large black bill, a broken white eyering and whitish supercilium.

References

Further reading

External links

 
 
 
 
 

streaked saltator
Birds of Costa Rica
Birds of Panama
Birds of Colombia
Birds of Venezuela
Birds of Guadeloupe
Birds of Trinidad and Tobago
Birds of Ecuador
Birds of Peru
streaked saltator
Taxonomy articles created by Polbot